The Brouwersdam is the seventh structure of the Delta Works in the Netherlands. Brouwersdam forms a barrier across the former estuary known as the Brouwershavense Gat. As a result, the area of water became known as the Grevelingenmeer.

Construction

The Grevelingendam between Goeree-Overflakkee and Schouwen-Duiveland was completed in 1965. The Gravelingen south of Goeree-Overflakkee were still connected to the North Sea. The storm surge could therefore be higher here, so dykes were raised on the south side of the island in 1965. Construction of the Brouwersdam was begun immediately after the Gavelingendam was completed in order to shorten the period of higher flood. After more than six years, in the spring of 1971, the dam was finished. Between 1964 and 1971 there had been some very high water levels. In November 1966 the water was just a few centimeters below the level of the infamous floods of February 1, 1953.

Construction of the six-kilometer long dam was begun in 1962. The inlet between Goeree-Overflakke and Schouwen-Duiveland was 30 meters deep. As with other dams, caissons with holes were lowered, allowing the tides to go through during the construction of the dam. This avoided creating too strong a current in the narrowing gap. This method was used for the northern gap at De Kous.

Besides the caissons for the Southern  gap, the Brouwershavense Gat, a cableway was used. From the cableway, large blocks of concrete were dropped in the trench, on top of which sand was sprayed. This constructed two large sandbars. The local channel was too deep and the water flowed too fast for the caissons method. After all the caissons were lowered, all the gaps were plugged.

The Brouwersdam was finished in 1971. Following the completion of the Gravelingen the fall in water level exposed about 3,000 hectares of dry land. The road to the dam (National Highway 57 ) was commissioned on March 30, 1973. Later another passage lock, the Brouwerssluis, was installed in the dam and was completed on 1 June 1978 .

Activities

Halfway through the dam is a marina and the holiday park, Port Zélande . In the area water sports such as kite-surfing and windsurfing are popular.

The Rijdend Tram Museum Foundation operates a route from Ouddorp (Punt de Goeree), via Port Zélande, to Scharendijke using historic stock from the Rotterdamse Tramweg Maatschappijt.

The three-day "Concert at Sea" music festival has been held annually since 2006 at the Brouwersdam.

References

Delta Works
Dams completed in 1971
Dams in South Holland
Dams in Zeeland
Buildings and structures in Schouwen-Duiveland
Goeree-Overflakkee